Arion Women's Football Club is an amateur soccer club based in Singapore, North-East Region and participate in the Women's Premier League. The club was established in 2005 by a group of 5 zealous footballers who wanted to develop their skills and to promote the women's football in Singapore.

The club fields team in Women's Premier League, Women's Challenge Cup, Women's National League and Women's Youth League for women's category and youth girl's category.

History
The name Arion was derived from a character in Greek mythology. Arion was Hercules's war stallion. He served the hero bravely and even saved him from death. He was later mastered by Adrastus, who, thanks to Arion was the only one to survive the war called the Seven Against Thebes.

The Greek name Arion actually means 'Better, Stronger and Braver' - a motto the club lives by.

Players

2020 WPL Still Aerion WFC Squad

2019 WNL Royal Arion WFC Squad

Honours

Domestic
Women's Premier League
Runners-up (1): 2008
Women's Challenge Cup
Champion (1): 2009
Runners-up (2): 2010, 2019

Club Structure

In 2021, Arion Women's Football Club embarked on a partnership with The French Football Academy Singapore. Through the partnership, the FFA's technical director Patrick Vallee oversees the Arion FC trainings and the Arion players support the FFA's Girls' Program. Arion FC's first team has consistently been one of the top 3 teams in the FAS Women's Premier league since 2005. There are currently two teams in Arion Women's Football Club. The first team, Still, is home to a handful of national team players and they participate in the FAS Women's Premier league. The second team, Royal, is a development team that participates in the FAS Women's National League. Royal was created for player's returning to the sport as well as beginner players who would like to experience competitive football.

References

External links
 FAS official website
 FAS WNL official website
 FAS WCC official website

Women's football in Singapore
Football clubs in Singapore
2005 establishments in Singapore